The Miahuatlán cotton rat (Sigmodon planifrons) was formerly considered a rodent species in the family Cricetidae. It is found only on the Pacific slope of the Sierra de Miahuatlán in the Mexican state of Oaxaca, where it lives in deciduous tropical forest. The IUCN currently considers it to be conspecific with Sigmodon alleni.

References 

Cotton rats
Mammals described in 1933
Taxobox binomials not recognized by IUCN